The 12 Baza Bezzałogowych Statków Powietrznych is a Polish Air Force base, located 5 km north of Mirosławiec.

It was constituted as 12 Baza Lotnicza on 1 January 2001.

In 2008, it was the site of the Mirosławiec air accident.

References

External links

Airports in Poland
Polish Air Force bases
Wałcz County
Buildings and structures in West Pomeranian Voivodeship
Polish intelligence agencies